Gulnar Marfat qizi Mammadova (born May 11, 1991 in Ali-Bayramly) is an Azerbaijani chess player who holds the titles of International master and Woman Grandmaster.

She won the Azerbaijani Chess Championship in 2021.

In the 2016 Women's Chess Olympiad, Mammadova won the individual gold medal for the best performance on board 3.

References

External links 

Gulnar Mammadova at 365Chess.com
Gulnar Mammadova at Chess-DB.com 

Living people
1991 births
Chess International Masters
Chess woman grandmasters
Azerbaijani female chess players